Museo Archeologico Nazionale di Campli (Italian for National Archaeology Museum of Campli)  is an archaeology museum in Campli, Abruzzo.

History

Collection

References

Notes

External links

Campli
Museums in Abruzzo
Archaeological museums in Italy
National museums of Italy